Electrotaxis, also known as galvanotaxis, is the directed motion of biological cells or organisms guided by an electric field or current. The directed motion of electrotaxis can take many forms, such as; growth, development, active swimming, and passive migration. A wide variety of biological cells can naturally sense and follow DC electric fields. Such electric fields arise naturally in biological tissues during development and healing. These and other observations have led to research into how applied electric fields can impact wound healing. An increase in wound healing rate is regularly observed and this is thought to be due to the cell migration and other signaling pathways that are activated by the electric field. Additional research has been conducted into how applied electric fields impact cancer metastasis, morphogenesis, neuron guidance, motility of pathogenic bacteria, biofilm formation, and many other biological phenomena.

History
In 1889, German physiologist Max Verworn applied a low-level direct current to a mixture of bacterial species and observed that some moved toward the anode and others moved to the cathode. Just two years later, in 1891, Belgian microscopist E. Dineur made the first known report of vertebrate cells migrating directionally in a direct current, a phenomenon which he coined galvanotaxis. Dineur used a zinc–copper cell to apply a constant current to the abdominal cavity of a frog via a pair of platinum electrodes. He found that inflammatory leukocytes aggregated at the negative electrode.
Since these pioneering studies, a variety of different cell types and organisms have been shown to respond to electric fields.

Mechanism
Understanding of the underlying mechanisms that cause electrotaxis to occur is limited. The diversity of biological cells and environmental conditions make it likely that there are many different mechanisms that allow for cells to migrate due to electric fields. Some researchers have indicated that cells move passively without any specific sensing mechanisms applied to alter active motility.

Bacteria
In a sufficiently strong electric field, small cells may move as uniformly charged particles or dipoles. Other research reports suggest that bacteria cells might perceive local electric fields via chemotaxis. This is done by sensing redox molecules that have formed a gradient relative to the poised electrical surface in the local environment.

Mammalian Cells
The method of detection of a field in mammalian cells is under active investigation and might involve several mechanisms. For now, it is thought that redistribution of membrane-bound sensors dragged by Coulombic forces and electro-osmosis at the membrane would cause the cell to polarize, then migrate.

See also
 Bioelectricity
 Electrofishing

References

External links 

Taxes (biology)